Barbara Gibson (born 25 August 1962) is an American-born British politician and academic. Gibson was a Liberal Democrat Member of the European Parliament (MEP) for the East of England between 2019 and the United Kingdom's withdrawal from the EU.

Early life 
Gibson was born in Oklahoma City in 1962 and moved to the United Kingdom in 2002.

Gibson earned a PhD in Intercultural Communication and has lectured on this topic in the context of global business for universities and business schools in the UK and across Europe, including Birkbeck, University of London.

Political career 
Gibson was elected to Hertfordshire County Council in 2017, winning her seat from the Conservatives who had held it since 2009.

Gibson was elected to the European Parliament at the 2019 European Parliamentary election. She was placed first on the party list in the East of England constituency, and was elected alongside Lucy Nethsingha, who was placed second.

She was a member of the Committee on International Trade where she played a key role in deciding whether the EU should lower tariffs or harmonise regulations between countries outside of the EU. Gibson was also a member of the Delegation to the ACP-EU Joint Parliamentary Assembly as well a Substitute on three other EU Parliamentary bodies: the Committee on Employment and Social Affairs, the Committee on Regional Development and the Delegation for relations with the countries of Southeast Asia and the Association of Southeast Asian Nations (ASEAN).

With more than 25 years’ experience as a business communication professional, Gibson has worked with companies across the world; is a past international chair of the International Association of Business Communicators (IABC); past-president of SIETAR UK (the Society for Intercultural Education, Training and Research); and a past International Group Chair of the CIPR (Chartered Institute of Public Relations).

Having come third in Stevenage at the 2017 general election, she was expected to stand as the Liberal Democrat candidate in Welwyn Hatfield in 2019 but she didn't.

Personal life 
Gibson lives with her husband and two dogs in Welwyn, Hertfordshire.

Electoral history

2019 European Parliament election

References

External links
 Official website
European Parliament
 Facebook
Twitter

Living people
1962 births
MEPs for England 2019–2020
Liberal Democrats (UK) MEPs
Liberal Democrats (UK) councillors
Liberal Democrats (UK) parliamentary candidates
Members of Hertfordshire County Council
21st-century women MEPs for England
Academics of Birkbeck, University of London
21st-century American women politicians
British people of American descent
American expatriates in the United Kingdom
Politicians from Oklahoma City
People from Welwyn
21st-century American politicians
American women academics